Josias Du Pré Alexander (1771 – 20 Aug 1839) was an Irish-born officer of the British East India Company who sat in the House of Commons of the United Kingdom in two periods between 1820 and 1832.

Born in County Londonderry, Alexander joined the East India Company in 1796, and later became  a private merchant in Calcutta.  His time in India gained him huge wealth.

He returned to the United Kingdom in 1818, and bought an estate in Hampshire. In 1820 he and his brother James jointly purchased the rotten borough of Old Sarum from their cousin Du Pre Alexander, 2nd Earl of Caledon, and returned himself to Parliament that year. With support of the Chancellor Nicholas Vansittart, 1st Baron Bexley, he was elected as a director of East India Company, a post he held until 1838.

References 
 

1771 births
1839 deaths
People from County Londonderry
Directors of the British East India Company
Members of the Parliament of the United Kingdom for Old Sarum
UK MPs 1820–1826
UK MPs 1826–1830
UK MPs 1830–1831
UK MPs 1831–1832